Inermorostrum is a genus of primitive odontocete from early Oligocene (Rupelian) marine deposits in South Carolina belonging to the family Xenorophidae.

Description and biology
Inermorostrum is largely distinguished from other xenorophiids in having a greatly reduced rostrum devoid of functional teeth. The short, toothless rostrum is unusual for early odontocetes, showing that Inermorostrum mostly preyed on squids and other marine invertebrates by means of suction-feeding.

References

Oligocene mammals of North America
Oligocene cetaceans
Fossil taxa described in 2017